Inez Clough (1873-1933) was a singer, dancer, and film actress in the United States during the early 1900s. Clough, an African American, was born on March 1, 1873, in Worcester, Massachusetts, and died on November 21, 1933, in Elgin, Illinois.

Career
Clough spent much of her early life in Massachusetts, attending school in Worcester and studying piano and voice in Boston. In 1896, Clough joined Oriental America, a Broadway theatre show created by the Vaudeville impresario John William Isham. In 1897, Clough moved to London for the show's European tour.

Describing her troupe's experience abroad, Thomas Riis wrote that her acting troupe observed "comparatively lavish facilities and larger pit, orchestras than were customary in America. The hospitality shown towards them undoubtedly impressed Afro-American travelers" who because of racism and racist laws frequently experienced discrimination or inferior accommodations in the United States. In contrast, many African Americans experienced greatly different treatment in Europe than they did in the United States. After touring with Oriental America, Clough remained in London for about ten years. In those ten years she gave voice lessons, did solo shows, and was a member of The Drury Lane Pantomimes.

In the early 1900s, Clough returned to the United States and continued her acting career, primarily performing in all-black musical comedy shows. She performed in The Shoo-Fly Regiment (1907) by Bob Cole and J. Rosamond Johnson and also toured with the Williams and Walker company.

In 1917, she acted onstage in Three Plays For a Negro Theatre. This play, written by Ridgely Torrence, was put on at the Garden Theatre in New York City.

Reflecting on this play, writer Benjamin Griffith Brawley wrote that it was a drama that aimed to "get away from the minstrelsy and burlesque" that predominated the early African American theater scene "and honestly present Negro characters face to face with all the problems that test the race in the crucible of American civilization". Writer James Weldon Johnson said the play "demanded the serious attention of the critics and the general public." Clough's participation in this production was widely publicized.

Clough also acted in many silent films in the early 1920s. These films include Easy Money, Ties of Blood, and Secret Sorrow.

Personal life
Clough married Henry Peter Hogan in New York City  where she resided for the majority of the rest of her life. By the end of her life, she had significant mental issues, accompanied by other health afflictions, including cancer.

References

1873 births
1933 deaths
African-American actresses
Actresses from Massachusetts
American silent film actresses
20th-century American actresses
People from Worcester, Massachusetts
20th-century African-American women
20th-century African-American people